Peter Foster (born 2 June 1960) is a former Australian rules footballer who represented  and  in the Australian Football League.

He became a mainstay in that position for the rest of his career. 

Foster finished equal 5th in the 1988 Brownlow Medal and won Footscray's best and fairest award in 1990.

His son, Jayden Foster, was selected by Carlton in the 2014 AFL Draft.

References

External links

1960 births
Living people
Australian rules footballers from Victoria (Australia)
Western Bulldogs players
Fitzroy Football Club players
Victorian State of Origin players
Charles Sutton Medal winners
Coragulac Football Club players
People from Colac, Victoria
Australia international rules football team players